Paolo de Lorenzi (1733 – after 1790) was an Italian painter of the late Baroque period. A native of Ceneda. He was a pupil of Giovanni Battista Bellucci and Piazzetta. He became progressively blind.

References

People from Vittorio Veneto
18th-century Italian painters
Italian male painters
Italian Baroque painters
1733 births
Year of death unknown
18th-century Italian male artists